MIE Live is a live album Japanese singer MIE. Recorded live at Shibuya Public Hall on October 3, 1981, the album was released on February 21, 1982. MIE Live features cover songs and a medley of Pink Lady hit singles and B-sides. The album was reissued on October 24, 2007 as MIE Live +2, with two bonus tracks.

Track listing 
Side A

Side B

2007 CD bonus tracks

References

External links
 
 
 

1982 live albums
Mie albums
Victor Entertainment albums
Japanese-language live albums